Richard Fairclough  may refer to:

Richard Fairclough (divine) (died 1682)
 Daniel Featley (died 1645), sometimes called Richard Fairclough